Karlodinium conicum is a species of unarmored dinoflagellates from the genus Karlodinium. It was first isolated from the Australian region of the Southern Ocean. It is large-sized and is characterized by having a distinct conical epicone and spherical posterior nucleus, hence its name. It is considered potentially ichthyotoxic.

References

Further reading
Mooney, Ben D., et al. "Survey for karlotoxin production in 15 species of gymnodinioid dinoflagellates (Kareniaceae, Dinophyta) 1." Journal of Phycology45.1 (2009): 164-175.
Mooney, Ben D., Gustaaf M. Hallegraeff, and Allen R. Place. "Ichthyotoxicity of four species of gymnodinioid dinoflagellates (Kareniaceae, Dinophyta) and purified karlotoxins to larval sheepshead minnow." Harmful Algae 9.6 (2010): 557-562.

External links

WORMS

Species described in 2008
Gymnodiniales